The Hvaler Tunnel is a subsea road tunnel which connects the island of Kirkøy to the rest of Hvaler in Viken county, Norway.

History
Prior to the tunnel, services were provided by Hvaler Båt- og Fergeselskap. In 1986, Hvalertunnelen AS was established to take up a loan to build the tunnel, and pay the loan through collected toll fares. Tolls started at 130 Norwegian krone (NOK) and ended at 154 by 2007, when the loan was paid off. For another two years, a NOK 20 fee was collected to finance a bicycle path on the island. Since 22 April 2010, it is possible to make mobile telephone calls from the tunnel.

References

Hvaler
Subsea tunnels in Norway
Road tunnels in Viken
1989 establishments in Norway